Nikitas M. Kaklamanis (born 1 April 1946 in Andros) is a Greek New Democracy (ND) politician and former mayor of Athens. He is also a former Minister for Health and Social Solidarity. In the Greek local elections of 2010 he lost the position of mayor after being defeated by Giorgos Kaminis.

Medical career
Kaklamanis was born in Andros. Kaklamanis studied medicine at the Medical School of the University of Athens. His medical training was spent in Ioannina. From 1975 to 1981, he worked at the Aretaieio Hospital in Athens, first as an assistant and then as a registrar. He qualified as a radiation oncologist, his second specialisation, in 1980. He was awarded his doctorate in 1981. He served as secretary-general to the Panhellenic Medical Association from 1984 to 1989 and was elected on the ND ticket. In 1989, he was elected Assistant Professor of Radiotherapy–Oncology at the University of Athens.

In Popular Culture.
Some of his rivals or haters nicknamed him "Omer Prioni" (a pun of the Albanian Name Vrioni and the Greek word prioni. Prioni means "saw" in Greek language) or Nikitaras The Woodeater (a pun of the Greek 1821 Revolution Hero Nikitaras The Turkeater) because Nikita Kaklamanis cutted a lot of trees

External links
 City Mayors Profile of Nikitas Kaklamanis
 
 

1946 births
People from Andros
Living people
National and Kapodistrian University of Athens alumni
Academic staff of the National and Kapodistrian University of Athens
New Democracy (Greece) politicians
Greek MPs 1990–1993
MEPs for Greece 1994–1999
Greek MPs 2000–2004
Greek MPs 2004–2007
Mayors of Athens
Greek MPs 2012 (May)
Greek MPs 2012–2014
Greek MPs 2015 (February–August)
Health ministers of Greece
Greek oncologists
Greek MPs 2015–2019
20th-century Greek physicians
Greek MPs 2019–2023